Avitohol Point is a point on the north coast of Livingston Island, Antarctica projecting  into Hero Bay to form the west side of the entrance to Skravena Cove and the southeast side of the entrance to Prisoe Cove. It is surmounted by Fletcher Nunatak and Belev Nunatak. The point is named after the legendary Khan Avitohol listed in the 8th Century Nominalia of the Bulgarian Khans, who laid the foundations of the Bulgarian statehood in Europe in 165 AD.

Location

The point was mapped by Bulgaria in 2005 and 2009 and is registered in the SCAR Composite Antarctic Gazetteer.

See also
 Livingston Island

Maps
 L.L. Ivanov et al. Antarctica: Livingston Island and Greenwich Island, South Shetland Islands. Scale 1:100000 topographic map. Sofia: Antarctic Place-names Commission of Bulgaria, 2005.
 L.L. Ivanov. Antarctica: Livingston Island and Greenwich, Robert, Snow and Smith Islands. Scale 1:120000 topographic map.  Troyan: Manfred Wörner Foundation, 2009.
 L.L. Ivanov. Antarctica: Livingston Island and Smith Island. Scale 1:100000 topographic map. Manfred Wörner Foundation, 2017.

Notes

References
 Avitohol Point. SCAR Composite Antarctic Gazetteer 
 Bulgarian Antarctic Gazetteer. Antarctic Place-names Commission. (details in Bulgarian, basic data in English)

External links
 Avitohol Point. Adjusted Copernix satellite image

Headlands of Livingston Island